The Carminati family is a Bergamese family originally based in Val Brembilla. The first known reference to the Carminati was in a message from Pope John XVIII to Pietro Carminati della valle Brembilla in 6 January 1006 where the Pope, between other privileges, conceded to Pietro's son, Giacomo, the possibility of succession of the Bishop of Bergamo and to each member of the House of Carminati and its descendants the title of Knights and Counts for "valor demonstrated against the enemies of the faith of Christ and extension of the same ....".

During the Wars in Lombardy in 19 January 1443, the Carminati and other families were exiled from Val Brembilla in an event known as "La cacciata dei Brembillesi".

Notes

References

External links

 Stemmi e Gonfaloni - Families of Valle Brembana
 Encyclopedia of the Lombardy Families
 The 20 most common names in Bergamo

Italian noble families
Families of Milan